Seven ships of the French Navy have borne the name Vengeur ('Avenger'):

Ships named Vengeur 
  (1765–1785), a 64-gun ship of the line
  (1790–1792), a 
 Vengeur (1794), a 20-gun corvette
  (1799), an 8-gun schooner 
  (1803–1806), a 120-gun 
  (1872–1905), an armoured coast guard
 Vengeur, a monitor type ironclad of 1882.

Ships with similar names 
 The 74-gun ship of the line Marseillois (or Marseillais) was renamed  ("Avenger of the People) in 1791, and was often referred to simply as Vengeur – this ship fought, and was sunk, at the Third Battle of Ushant on 1 June 1794.

See also

Sources and references 
 

French Navy ship names